Ralph Gray may refer to:
 Ralph Gray (politician) (died 1813), seigneur and politician in Lower Canada
 Ralph Gray (industrialist) (died 1863), co-founder of American glass company Hemingray
 Ralph Gray (union leader) (died 1931), co-leader of Alabama Share Cropper's Union

See also
 Ralph Grey (disambiguation)